The Château de Clermont, built between 1643 and 1649, is located in the commune of Le Cellier, 27 kilometres (17 mi) from Nantes in France. It was owned by the Maupassant family before becoming the property of the actor Louis de Funès.

Appearance and architecture
The appearance of the château has remained broadly the same since its construction at the time of the regency of Anne of Austria during the minority of Louis XIV. Its southern aspect, which overlooks the river Loire offers a panoramic view over the Pays des Mauges and the Pays de Retz. The northern aspect has a shaded avenue perpendicular to the Paris-Nantes road framed by the original wings of the château. It is surrounded by 3 hectares (7.4 acres) of parkland and a vineyard of 17 hectares (42 acres). Louis de Funès had a rose garden planted, but nothing remains of it today.

Château de Clermont shows three major characteristics of the Louis XIII style:

 pink bricks and masonry which softens the formal lines of the layout
 distinctive and unique slate roofs of various of the main buildings
 the central part of the building being used to house the main staircase and dominating the surrounding construction.

The large avenue crosses two moats and brings visitors in the central courtyard flanked by the wings.

Wings
The two wings contained the servants rooms: sleeping quarters, stables, and greenhouses, placed where they could be watched by the master of the house. Where the wings join the main body of the house are the kitchens on the right and on the left the chapel, the altar still displaying its original retable. From the centre of the wings arched passages arched lead out: on the right to the gardens and on the left to the farmyard. The two entrances provide both convenience and break the monotony of the formal lines. A gallery  runs along the first floor of the right-hand wing.

The wings of Clermont are very different from those of other châteaux from the same period of the 17th century. Up until 1624, wings were designed to be of the same or very similar height to that of the main house, so the courtyard was enclosed on three sides, an echo of the former defensive role of castles. The Rocher-Portail, near Fougères, is a rare intact example of this kind of architecture. Clermont is one of the last châteaux to have wings attached to the central building in this fashion. They are, however, smaller, lower and have an Italian influence, natural enough at a time when many French architects were studying in Rome and Venice. Clermont was completed just before 1650, the year when, following the trend started by the builders of Vaux-le-Vicomte and François Mansart at the Château de Beaumesnil, the central bodies of the majority of new castles started to be built separated from the wings.

Mixture of styles

In a design that was, at the time, very modern, there are a number of features that are reminiscent of older architecture: corbelling is used on both the northern and southern sides, and on the Loire side machicolations are utilised to support the high roofs. Regardless of their architectural heritage, overall the features blend to a harmonious whole.

History
The château was inherited by the de Funès family from an aunt, the Countess of Maupassant. It was built by the Chenu de Clermont, a family of important military administrators. René Chenu, (1599–1672) was a long-time governor of the fortified towns of Oudon and Champtoceaux which dominated the Loire upstream. His son Hardy Chenu (1621–1683) was in charge of the fortifications, cities, castles and fortified towns of Brittany.

The Chenu were vassals of the House of Condé, who had many holdings in the west of France, and this feudal relationship, so strong under Ancien Régime, was increased by a strong personal friendship. Rene Chenu was the contemporary and loyal ally of Henry II de Bourbon, prince de Condé. The birth and death of Hardy Chenu coincide with those of Louis II de Bourbon-Condé, the Grand Condé, whom he served. It is traditionally held that one of the Chenu, either the father or the son, saved the life of their master, and that Clermont was constructed to express his recognition of the act. In any case, the construction of Clermont, with its imposing proportions, testifies to some princely expenditure. The Château de Clermont was built shortly after the Battle of Rocroi (19 May 1643), where the Grand Condé, saved the throne of the enfant Louis XIV and merited a considerable reward. It reflects enthusiasm of a period filled with glory. For 30 years the château was the property of French comedian Louis de Funès. In 2013 the mansion was converted to a museum dedicated to the life and times of Funès.

See also
 List of castles in France

References
Jean de la Robrie, extract from Vielles Maisons Françaises, number 49, July 1971

Clermont, Chateau de
Houses completed in 1649
Châteaux in Loire-Atlantique
1649 establishments in France